Maria Zofia Dulęba (17 October 1881– 6 May 1959) was a Polish stage and film actress. She made her stage debut in 1902 and went on to perform in a number of films, mostly in the silent era. She later also taught drama.

Selected filmography
 Meir Ezofowicz (1911)
 Przesady (1912)
 Obrona Częstochowy (1913)
 Wykolejeni (1913)
 Slodycz grzechu (1914)
 Countess Walewska (1914)
 Bestia (1917)
 The Unspeakable (1924)
 Żona i nie żona (1939)

References

Bibliography 
 Lerski, Halina. Historical Dictionary of Poland, 966-1945. ABC-CLIO, 30 Jan 1996.

External links 
 

1881 births
1959 deaths
Polish stage actresses
Polish film actresses
Polish silent film actresses
20th-century Polish actresses
Actresses from Kraków
Recipients of the State Award Badge (Poland)